Zill-e-Huma is a Pakistani politician who was a Member of the Provincial Assembly of the Punjab, from 2008 to May 2018.

Early life and education
She was born on 7 November 1977 in Kharian.

She earned the degree of the Bachelor of Business Administration from Al-Khair University campus in Islamabad in 1999.

Political career
Huma was elected to the Provincial Assembly of the Punjab  as a candidate for Pakistan Muslim League (N) (PML-N) for Constituency PP-8 (Rawalpindi-VIII) in 2008 Pakistani general election.

She was re-elected to the Provincial Assembly of the Punjab as a candidate of PML-N on a reserved seat for women in 2013 Pakistani general election.

References

Living people
Punjab MPAs 2013–2018
1977 births
Pakistan Muslim League (N) politicians
Punjab MPAs 2008–2013
21st-century Pakistani women politicians